Tatria biremis is a species of tapeworm in the family Amabiliidae. 

It infects certain grebes (Podiceps) and uses the water boatman species Paracorixa concinna as an intermediate host.

References

Cestoda
Animal parasites of vertebrates
Animals described in 1904